Gervais Colquhoun 'George' Arnott (30 June 1901 – 5 September 1985) was an Australian rules footballer who played with Hawthorn in the Victorian Football League (VFL).

He played ten games at Hawthorn, spending his time playing at full back.

Arnott stayed only one season before moving on to Dimboola in the Wimmera.

Notes

External links 

1901 births
1985 deaths
Australian rules footballers from Melbourne
Hawthorn Football Club players
Maryborough Football Club players
People from Flemington, Victoria